Kevin Harvey may refer to:

Kevin Harvey (ice hockey) (born 1984), Canadian ice hockey player
Kevin Harvey (venture capitalist), American venture capitalist
Kevin Harvey, actor in the TV series Good Cop
Kevin Harvey, fictional character on the Australian soap opera Neighbours